Queen Emma may refer to:

 Emma of Italy (–after 987), queen of West Francia
 Emma of Normandy (–1052), queen of England, Denmark and Norway
 Queen Emma (Hawaii) (1836–1885), queen of Hawaii
 Emma Forsayth (1850–1913), businesswoman known as "Queen Emma of New Guinea"
 Emma of Waldeck and Pyrmont (1858–1934), queen of the Netherlands

Ships
 HMS Queen Emma, a Royal Navy troop ship, formerly MS Koningin Emma
 Queen Emma Bridge, across St. Anna Bay in Curaçao